The 1992 Amstel Gold Race was the 27th edition of the annual road bicycle race "Amstel Gold Race", held on Sunday April 25, 1992, in the Dutch province of Limburg. The race stretched 247.5 kilometres, with the start in Heerlen and the finish in Maastricht. There were a total of 168 competitors, with 82 cyclists finishing the race.

Result

External links
Results

Amstel Gold Race
1992 in road cycling
1992 in Dutch sport
1992 UCI Road World Cup
April 1992 sports events in Europe